Richard Lane may refer to:

Sports
Night Train Lane (1927–2002), American football player
Dick Lane (baseball) (1927–2018), American baseball player
Richard Lane (cricketer) (1794–1870), English cricketer
Richard Lane (rugby union) (born 1993), British rugby player

Others
Richard Lane (MP) (died 1438), MP for Staffordshire (UK Parliament constituency)
Richard Lane (politician) (c. 1667–1756), British merchant and politician
Richard Lane (architect) (1795–1880), English architect
Richard Lane (barrister) (1584–1650), barrister and Lord Keeper of the Great Seal of England
Richard Lane (composer) (1933–2004), American music composer and arranger
Dick Lane (announcer) (1899–1982), American actor who was best known as an announcer on television
Richard Lane (writer) (1918–2008), Australian radio and television writer
Richard Douglas Lane (1936–2002), scholar, author, collector, and dealer of Japanese art (known as Dick Lane)
Richard James Lane (1800–1872), English sculptor and lithographer
Sir Richard Lane, 1st Baronet (died 1668), of the Lane baronets

See also
Dick Lane (disambiguation)
Richard Lane-Poole (1883–1971), senior officer in the UK Royal Navy